Kouros Shahmiri, also known by the mononym "Kouros", is an Iranian–American pop singer, best known for being part of the pop duo Andy & Kouros with Andranik Madadian (Andy).

Andy and Kouros released four albums together: Khastegary (1985), Parvaz (1988), the hugely successful album Balla, and finally Goodbye (1991). The two split in 1992, with both Andy and Kouros going on to have successful individual solo careers.

After the split, Kouros has released a number of solo albums.

Andy and Kouros reunited several times after that point. In 2002 and 2004 they performed together for a sold-out audience in San Jose, California. In 2009, Andy & Kouros they went on an international tour together in the Iranian diaspora, and performed together again in May, 2010. They also appeared together on a music video by Farez remaking their hit "Niloufar".

Discography

Albums
as Andy & Kouros 
1985: Khastegary
Notable tracks "Three of Us" / "Madar"
1987: Parvaz
Notable tracks: "Chi Mishod", "Restless", "Niloufar", "Topoli", "Restless"
1990: Balla
Notable tracks: "Balla", "Leila", "Negah", "Sheytoon Balla", "Khodaye Asemoonha", "Don't Go Away"
1991: Goodbye
Notable tracks: "Strange Love", "Yasaman"

Solo
1992: 
1995: 
1998: 
2000: 
2010:

References

Living people
Iranian composers
Exiles of the Iranian Revolution in the United States
Iranian pop singers
Iranian singer-songwriters
Iranian music arrangers
Iranian record producers
American male composers
American male pop singers
American male singer-songwriters
American music arrangers
American record producers
1953 births
20th-century Iranian male singers
21st-century Iranian male singers